I'm Gonna Be a Country Girl Again is the fifth album by Cree singer/songwriter Buffy Sainte-Marie. As its title suggested, it saw her embrace Nashville country music with the help of session veterans such as the Jordanaires, Grady Martin, Roy M. Huskey, Jr. and Floyd Cramer. The album included re-recordings of "Now That the Buffalo's Gone" and "The Piney Wood Hills" from her first and second albums respectively. "Tall Trees in Georgia", in contrast to most of the material, showed Sainte-Marie performing in a style reminiscent of her earliest work.

I'm Gonna Be a Country Girl Again was not as well received critically or even commercially as her previous four albums, and relatively few of the songs unique to it have notable cover versions (Neko Case's cover of "Soulful Shade of Blue" may be considered an exception). The title tune, however, was to become a  Top 40 UK hit after she reached the Top Ten there with the title tune to the movie Soldier Blue (from her album She Used to Wanna Be a Ballerina).

Track listing 
All songs composed by Buffy Sainte-Marie except where noted.

 "I'm Gonna Be a Country Girl Again" – 2:59
 "He's a Pretty Good Man If You Ask Me" – 2:29
 "Uncle Joe" (Traditional) – 2:10
 "A Soulful Shade of Blue" – 2:18
 "From the Bottom of My Heart" – 2:34
 "Sometimes When I Get to Thinkin'" – 3:01
 "The Piney Wood Hills" – 3:08
 "Now That the Buffalo's Gone" – 2:56
 "They Gotta Quit Kickin' My Dawg Around" (Traditional) – 1:39
 "Tall Trees in Georgia" – 3:33
 "The Love of a Good Man" – 2:54
 "Take My Hand for Awhile" – 2:34
 "Gonna Feel Much Better When You're Gone" – 1:46

Charts

Weekly charts 
Billboard (North America)

Single

References 

1968 albums
Buffy Sainte-Marie albums
Albums produced by Maynard Solomon
Vanguard Records albums